Doringkloof is a residential suburb west of Centurion, Gauteng, South Africa.

References

Suburbs of Centurion, Gauteng